The Rabin cryptosystem is a family of public-key encryption schemes
based on a trapdoor function whose security, like that of RSA, is related to the difficulty of integer factorization.

The Rabin trapdoor function has the advantage that inverting it has been mathematically proven to be as hard as factoring integers, while there is no such proof known for the RSA trapdoor function.
It has the disadvantage that each output of the Rabin function can be generated by any of four possible inputs; if each output is a ciphertext, extra complexity is required on decryption to identify which of the four possible inputs was the true plaintext.
Naive attempts to work around this often either enable a chosen-ciphertext attack to recover the secret key or, by encoding redundancy in the plaintext space, invalidate the proof of security relative to factoring.

Public-key encryption schemes based on the Rabin trapdoor function are used mainly for examples in textbooks.
In contrast, RSA is the basis of standard public-key encryption schemes such as RSAES-PKCS1-v1_5 and RSAES-OAEP that are used widely in practice.

History
The Rabin trapdoor function was first published as part of the Rabin signature scheme in 1978 by Michael O. Rabin.
The Rabin signature scheme was the first digital signature scheme where forging a signature could be proven to be as hard as factoring.

The trapdoor function was later repurposed in textbooks as an example of a public-key encryption scheme,
which came to be known as the Rabin cryptosystem even though Rabin never published it as an encryption scheme.

Encryption Algorithm
Like all asymmetric cryptosystems, the Rabin system uses a key pair: a public key for encryption and a private key for decryption. The public key is published for anyone to use, while the private key remains known only to the recipient of the message.

Key generation

The keys for the Rabin cryptosystem are generated as follows:

 Compute . 
Then  is the public key and the pair  is the private key.

Encryption
A message  can be encrypted by first converting it to a number  using a reversible mapping, then computing .

Decryption
The message  can be recovered from the ciphertext  by taking its square root modulo  as follows.

 Compute the square root of  modulo  and  using these formulas:
 
 Use the extended Euclidean algorithm to find  and  such that . 
 Use the Chinese remainder theorem to find the four square roots of  modulo : 
 

One of these four values is the original plaintext , although which of the four is the correct one cannot be determined without additional information.

Computing square roots
For the first formula, we want to prove that . Since  the exponent  is an integer. The proof is trivial if , so we may assume that  does not divide . Note that  implies that , so c is a quadratic residue modulo . Then
 
The last step is justified by Euler's criterion.

Example
Take  as our plaintext. The ciphertext is thus 
.

Decryption proceeds as follows:
We can confirm that .
 Compute the four plaintext candidates:
 

and we see that  is the desired plaintext. Note that all four candidates are square roots of 15 mod 77. That is, for each candidate, so each  encrypts to the same value, 15.

Digital Signature Algorithm

The Rabin cryptosystem can be used to create and verify digital signatures. Creating a signature requires the private key . Verifying a signature requires the public key .

Signing
A message  can be signed with a private key  as follows.
 Generate a random value .
 Find a square root of  using the private key . This will produce the usual four results, .
 One might expect that squaring each  would produce . To determine if this is the case, square . If this does not yield , repeat this algorithm with a new random . The expected number of times this algorithm needs to be repeated before finding a suitable  is 4.

Verifying a signature
A signature  for a message  can be verified using the public key  as follows.
 Compute .
 Compute 
 The signature is valid if  and a forgery otherwise.

Evaluation of the algorithm

Effectiveness
Decrypting produces three false results in addition to the correct one, so that the correct result must be guessed. This is the major disadvantage of the Rabin cryptosystem and one of the factors which have prevented it from finding widespread practical use.

If the plaintext is intended to represent a text message, guessing is not difficult; however, if the plaintext is intended to represent a numerical value, this issue becomes a problem that must be resolved by some kind of disambiguation scheme. It is possible to choose plaintexts with special structures, or to add padding, to eliminate this problem. A way of removing the ambiguity of inversion was suggested by Blum and Williams: the two primes used are restricted to primes congruent to 3 modulo 4 and the domain of the squaring is restricted to the set of quadratic residues. These restrictions make the squaring function into a trapdoor permutation, eliminating the ambiguity.

Efficiency
For encryption, a square modulo n must be calculated. This is more efficient than RSA, which requires the calculation of at least a cube. 

For decryption, the Chinese remainder theorem is applied, along with two modular exponentiations. Here the efficiency is comparable to RSA.

Disambiguation introduces additional computational costs, and is what has prevented the Rabin cryptosystem from finding widespread practical use.

Security
It has been proven that any algorithm which finds one of the possible plaintexts for every Rabin-encrypted ciphertext can be used to factor the modulus . Thus, Rabin decryption for random plaintext is at least as hard as the integer factorization problem, something that has not been proven for RSA. It is generally believed that there is no polynomial-time algorithm for factoring, which implies that there is no efficient algorithm for decrypting a random Rabin-encrypted value without the private key . 

The Rabin cryptosystem does not provide indistinguishability against chosen plaintext attacks since the process of encryption is deterministic. An adversary, given a ciphertext and a candidate message, can easily determine whether or not the ciphertext encodes the candidate message (by simply checking whether encrypting the candidate message yields the given ciphertext). 

The Rabin cryptosystem is insecure against a chosen ciphertext attack (even when challenge messages are chosen uniformly at random from the message space). By adding redundancies, for example, the repetition of the last 64 bits, the system can be made to produce a single root. This thwarts this specific chosen-ciphertext attack, since the decryption algorithm then only produces the root that the attacker already knows. If this technique is applied, the proof of the equivalence with the factorization problem fails, so it is uncertain as of 2004 if this variant is secure.

See also
 Topics in cryptography
 Blum Blum Shub
 Shanks–Tonelli algorithm
 Schmidt–Samoa cryptosystem
 Blum–Goldwasser cryptosystem
 Kunerth%27s algorithm

Notes

References
 Buchmann, Johannes. Einführung in die Kryptographie. Second Edition. Berlin: Springer, 2001. 
 Menezes, Alfred; van Oorschot, Paul C.; and Vanstone, Scott A. Handbook of Applied Cryptography. CRC Press, October 1996. 
 Rabin, Michael. Digitalized Signatures and Public-Key Functions as Intractable as Factorization (in PDF). MIT Laboratory for Computer Science, January 1979.
 Scott Lindhurst, An analysis of Shank's algorithm for computing square  roots in finite fields. in R Gupta and K S Williams, Proc 5th Conf Can Nr Theo Assoc, 1999, vol 19 CRM Proc & Lec Notes, AMS, Aug 1999.
 R Kumanduri and C Romero, Number Theory w/ Computer Applications, Alg 9.2.9, Prentice Hall, 1997. A probabilistic for square root of a quadratic residue modulo a prime.

External links
 Menezes, Oorschot, Vanstone, Scott: Handbook of Applied Cryptography (free PDF downloads), see Chapter 8

Public-key encryption schemes